Yasmin Rashid ( : born 21 September 1950) is a Pakistani politician and social activist who was the Provincial Minister of Punjab for Primary & Secondary Healthcare and Specialised Healthcare & Medical Education, in office from August 2018 till April 2022 and then again from July 2022 till January 2023. She had been a member of the Provincial Assembly of the Punjab, from August 2018 till January 2023.

Early life and education
She was born on 21 September 1950 in Chakwal, Punjab, Pakistan.

She completed her early education in Neela village in Chakwal district before moving to Lahore where she was educated at the Convent of Jesus and Mary. She married in 1972.

In 1978, she did her MBBS from the Fatima Jinnah Medical University in Lahore. In 1984, she moved to the United Kingdom and enrolled in the Royal College of Obstetricians and Gynaecologists from where received a MRCOG degree in 1989 and a FRCOG degree in 1999.

She then received a degree in FCPS from Karachi's College of Physicians and Surgeons Pakistan.

Professional career
She served as the President of the Pakistan Medical Association Lahore from 1998 to 2000. She served as president of Pakistan Medical Association Punjab from 2008 to 2010 and has been the chairperson of the Task Force Women Development, and chairperson of the Women Health Committee in Punjab.

She is a gynaecologist by profession and had served as the head of the obstetrics and gynaecology department at King Edward Medical University. She also worked in Rawalpindi Medical University, Fatima Jinnah Medical University and headed the Genealogy department of Central Park Medical College.

Political career
Rashid retired from government service in 2010 and joined Pakistan Tehreek-e-Insaf (PTI) on the advice of her father-in-law.

She ran for the seat of the National Assembly of Pakistan as a candidate of PTI from NA-120 (Lahore-III) but was unsuccessful and secured 52,354 votes against then President of Pakistan Muslim League (N) Nawaz Sharif who won with 91,683 votes.

In July 2017, after Nawaz Sharif was disqualified by Supreme Court of Pakistan as Member of the National Assembly following the Panama Papers case verdict, NA-120 (Lahore-III) seat fell vacant and by-polls were called in the constituency. PTI nominated Rashid to run for the seat of the National Assembly as its candidate in the by-polls held in September 2017. However she lost the polls to Kulsoom Nawaz Sharif by a margin of 14,646 votes.

During the 2018 elections, she again contested from the same constituency, which had now been delimited NA-125 (Lahore-III). She managed to secure 105,857 votes but was ultimately unsuccessful against PML-N's Waheed Alam Khan, who got 122,327 votes. She was later elected to the Provincial Assembly of the Punjab as a candidate of PTI on a reserved seat for women. On 27 August 2018, she was inducted into the provincial Punjab cabinet of Chief Minister Sardar Usman Buzdar and was appointed as Provincial Minister of Punjab for primary and secondary healthcare, with the additional ministerial portfolio of specialised healthcare and medical education.

Family
She is married to Rashid Nabi Malik. Her husband belongs to a prominent political family. He is the son of the former Punjab Minister of Education Malik Ghulam Nabi. Her brother-in-law, Shahid Nabi Malik, remained affiliated with the Pakistan Peoples Party and was their candidate in the general elections in 1990 and 1993.

References

External links

Living people
1950 births
Pakistani gynaecologists
Pakistan Tehreek-e-Insaf MPAs (Punjab)
Politicians from Lahore
Pakistani women medical doctors
Academic staff of King Edward Medical University
People from Chakwal District
Punjab MPAs 2018–2023
Women members of the Provincial Assembly of the Punjab
Provincial ministers of Punjab
Women provincial ministers of Punjab
21st-century Pakistani women politicians